Kfar Yona is a city in the Sharon subdistrict in the Central District of Israel. It is about 7 km east of Netanya. In 2014, Kfar Yona's official status was changed from a local council to a city.

History

Before the 20th century, Kfar Yona formed part of the Forest of Sharon, a hallmark of the region’s historical landscape. It was an open woodland dominated by Mount Tabor Oak (Quercus ithaburensis), which extended from Kfar Yona in the north to Ra’ananna in the south. The local Arab inhabitants traditionally used the area for pasture, firewood and intermittent cultivation. The intensification of settlement and agriculture in the coastal plain during the 19th century led to deforestation and subsequent environmental degradation known from Hebrew sources.

Kfar Yona was established on lands in the Sharon plain purchased in 1932 from Mustafa Bushnaq and the Shanti family of Qalqilya.
 
Kfar Yona is named for Jean (Yona) Fischer, a Belgian Zionist. It was founded on Tu Bishvat, January 23, 1932 by Morris Fischer, Yona's son, a member of the World Jewish Congress, and was originally named Gan Yona (Yona's Garden).

In the 1948 Arab-Israeli War, Kfar Yona was on the front lines, and its defenders faced the Iraqi Army, which sought to reach Netanya and cut the Jewish forces in Israel in half. The new Israel Defense Forces repelled the Iraqi attacks and forced them back into the Samarian mountains, although Kfar Yona remained the easternmost Jewish settlement in the area. As a result of the 1949 Armistice Agreements, the border moved from Kfar Yona 8 km eastward, to just west of Tulkarm.

Kfar Yona was surrounded by orchards and its main income was from selling oranges. Most of these orchards are now the site of  new neighborhoods.

Next to Kfar Yona is the Area 21 military base, named for Mota Gur, which includes paratroopers, Nahal, military police, and other small bases. In addition, Kfar Yona borders Pardesiya and the Lev HaSharon Regional Council.

Neighborhoods

Kfar Yona Alef

The original ten homes and the first community building. The homes are small, one-story, private structures, with an average of three rooms each. The community building stands today empty and is falling into ruin, though the town council is interested in maintaining it for its sentimental and historical value. Alef also includes a new neighborhood accessed from the western entrance to the village, with recently built family homes and more under construction. The main avenue of this section of Alef is a street where residents of the village can be found walking or jogging at any hour. For the past year, the west entrance has had a gate and guard that operates from 11pm to 6am. The whole village is policed by a volunteer guard force, supervised by a small professional security team, for which the town residents pay a small municipal tax.

Kfar Yona Bet

Cheaper apartment buildings, which are the first site of the village for visitors who enter from the eastern entrance. (Both entrances are on Highway 57, the eastern entrance is about 2 km further down the road than the western entrance, when driving from Highway 2, Israel's main Coastal Road). The east entrance is completely shut and locked from 11pm to 6am. Bet also includes the New Project, which are lower apartment buildings, with bigger homes. The New Project on Menachem Begin Street faces the City Council building, the Community Center (funded by Jewish Federation of Greater Vancouver sister-city fundraising activities), the community basketball courts and water park (also a gift from Vancouver), and the Hadar Elementary School (Grades 1-6). Beyond the New Project, Bet includes more expensive townhouses and private homes. It also includes the Betzali Park.

Heftziba

Down Menachem Begin Street is Heftziba named for the construction company that built it. On top of the hill is an old mansion that belonged an Arab who married a Jewish woman.
Across Highway 57 is the new neighborhood of Alonim, also known as Kfar Yona Gimel. This neighborhood includes single-family homes, wide streetsand several parks

Sports and culture
The community center operates a music conservatory and holds public concerts. In 2006, 250 grade-school students participated in a basketball program. The older student's league has won championships. The community center holds classes in photography, ceramics, pottery and cooking.

Education
In 2010, Kfar Yona had 3 state schools, Hadar, Rimon and Amal, and a state-religious school, Bar Ilan. The town also has a junior high and high school, Ish Shalom.

Transportation
Highway 57 is the main traffic artery connecting Kfar Yona to other localities and the national road system—Netanya to the west and Highway 6 to the east.

The city has no railway connection and since 2014 has been served by the Kavim bus company, which replaced Nateev Express.

Sister cities 
 Vancouver, British Columbia, Canada
 New York City, New York, United States

Notable people
Zvi Bar
Zoya Semenduev
Yaakov Turner

References

External links
Official website 

Cities in Central District (Israel)
Cities in Israel
Populated places established in 1932
1932 establishments in Mandatory Palestine